Garn Stephens is a retired  American film, television and theatre actress and writer. She is known for her roles in the television series Phyllis and the 1982 horror film Halloween III: Season of the Witch.

Career
Stephens began her career on stage as a theatre actress. She performed as Estelle in the original stage play Father's Day in 1971 and played the original character Jan in the Broadway production of Grease the following year.

Throughout her 20 year career, Stephens made many television guest appearances, beginning in 1975 with an appearance on the series Wide World Mystery and a guest role on CBS sitcom All in the Family. The following year, Stephens received a leading role on the Golden Globe-winning television sitcom Phyllis with Cloris Leachman, the second spin-off from The Mary Tyler Moore Show. From the late seventies until the early nineties, Stephens appeared in several top rated television series, including Charlie's Angels, Family Ties, Falcon Crest and Quantum Leap.

During her career, Stephens starred in three feature films. In 1975, she appeared in The Sunshine Boys with Walter Matthau and George Burns, as well as Jake's M.O. She is best known for her role as Marge Guttman in the 1982 horror film Halloween III: Season of the Witch, which also starred her then-husband Tom Atkins. In 2003, she appeared at the Halloween: 25 Years of Terror convention, where she discussed how she received the role. Stephens had been friends with John Carpenter's then-wife Adrienne Barbeau, whom she had worked with on Grease. Stephens met Carpenter when she and Atkins were invited to see a premiere of Halloween in 1978 with Carpenter and Barbeau. Carpenter later offered her a role in Halloween III.

Stephens has also written for television, including a 1983 episode of the medical drama series St. Elsewhere, in which she received an Emmy Award nomination. Her writing credits also include Trapper John, M.D., Hotel and Trial by Jury.

Personal life
Stephens was formerly married to actor Tom Atkins. She lived with musician Stuart Niemi, with whom she has one child, Stuart Baird Niemi.

Stephens is currently writing crime/mystery stories.

Filmography

Writer

References

External links
 
 
 

1944 births
Living people
Actresses from Tulsa, Oklahoma
American film actresses
American television actresses
American television writers
Writers from Tulsa, Oklahoma
Screenwriters from Oklahoma
American women television writers
21st-century American women